Croitana arenaria, the inland sand-skipper, is a butterfly of the family Hesperiidae. It is endemic to Australia in the Northern Territory and South Australia.

The wingspan is about 20 mm.

The larvae feed on Enteropogon acicularis, Austrostipa platychaeta and Austrostipa elegantissima. They construct a shelter made from rolled leaves of its host plant where it rests during the day. Pupation takes place in this shelter.

External links
Australian Insects
Australian Faunal Directory

Trapezitinae
Butterflies described in 1979